A rogues' gallery is a collection of images used by police to identify suspects.

Rogues' gallery or rogues gallery may also refer to:

Films
Rogues' Gallery (1944 film), a film directed by Albert Herman
Rogue's Gallery (1968 film), a film directed by Leonard J. Horn 
Operation: Endgame, a 2010 film originally titled The Rogues Gallery

Music
Rogues Gallery, a 1985 album by the British rock group Slade
Rogue's Gallery: Pirate Ballads, Sea Songs, and Chanteys, a 2006 compilation album

Radio and television
 Rogue’s Gallery (radio series), 1940s NBC series
 Rogues' Gallery (TV series), a British series from the 1960s
 Rogues' Gallery (Gotham), an episode of the crime drama series Gotham

Other uses
The Rogues Gallery, an accessory booklet for the first-edition Advanced Dungeons & Dragons game
 List of Batman family enemies, fictional villains in Batman comics often termed the "rogues gallery"
 Vigenère cipher, a cryptographic method also known as the "rogues' gallery cipher"

See also
 Rogue (disambiguation)